We Are the Humans is the debut studio album by the experimental rock band The Humans, consisting of Toyah Willcox, Bill Rieflin and Chris Wong. The album was released in 2009 via Willcox's label Vertical Species.

Background
The band previewed the album at their first concerts in Estonia in October 2007. The material was then recorded in Seattle during 2008. The band returned to Estonia to perform the album in May 2009, joined on stage by Willcox's husband Robert Fripp. In February 2010, The Humans further promoted the album with a short UK tour.

Three music videos have been released from the album: "We Are the Humans" (2007), "Quicksilver" (2009) and "These Boots Are Made for Walkin'" (2009). The latter was also released as a single.

In 2020, the album was re-issued by Demon Music Group in vinyl and digital formats, credited to Toyah & The Humans.

Track listing
All songs written by Toyah Willcox, Bill Rieflin and Chris Wong, except 1, 3 (Willcox), 9 (Willcox/Robert Fripp) and 11 (Lee Hazlewood).

 "We Are the Humans" – 5:25
 "Is It Wrong" – 3:58
 "Twisted Soul" – 2:50
 "Telekinesis" – 3:17
 "Quicksilver" – 4:34
 "Labyrinth" – 2:45
 "Icarus" – 4:36
 "Noise in Your Head" – 3:41
 "This Belongs to You" – 5:47
 "Demigod" – 5:21
CD and digital edition bonus track
 "These Boots Are Made for Walkin'" (featuring Robert Fripp) – 3:10
2020 digital edition bonus track
 "We Are the Humans" (Toyah's Home Demo) – 3:45
 "Twisted Soul" (Toyah's Home Demo) – 2:49
 "Icarus" (Toyah's Home Demo) – 3:25

Personnel
 Toyah Willcox: voice, loops, angry bee
 Bill Rieflin: bass, synths, gadgets, whirring organ, drums, claps, hums, production
 Chris Wong: bass, guitar, organ, humming

References

External links
 Official audio stream on YouTube
 The official Toyah website

2009 debut albums
The Humans (UK band) albums